Bashmaq (also Romanized as Bāshmāq) is a village in Kuhsar Rural District, in the Central District of Hashtrud County, East Azerbaijan Province, Iran. At the 2006 census, its population was 286, in 57 families.

References 

Towns and villages in Hashtrud County